The Central District of Bardsir County is a district (bakhsh) in Bardsir County, Kerman Province, Iran. At the 2006 census, its population was 75,070, in 16,423 families.  The district has four cities: Bardsir, Golzar, Negar, and Dashtkar. The district has four rural districts (dehestan): Golzar Rural District, Kuh Panj Rural District, Mashiz Rural District, and Negar Rural District.

References 

Bardsir County
Districts of Kerman Province